Thomassique is a commune in the Cerca-la-Source Arrondissement, in the Centre department of Haiti. It has 42,557 inhabitants.

References

Populated places in Centre (department)
Communes of Haiti